Blankley is a surname. Notable people with the surname include:

Eric Blankley (1910–1954), English cricketer
George Blankley, coach at Boise Junior College during the mid-20th century
Tony Blankley (died 2012), U.S. political analyst and commentator

See also
The Man from Blankley's, 1903 play by F. Anstey made into a 1930 film